, was a monthly Japanese light novel magazine, first published in September 2006. The magazine is aimed at young adult males. It was first titled Novel Japan, but on June 30, 2007, its title was changed to Charano!.

Serialized works
Alexion Saga
Armored Trooper Votoms: Command Vorct
Chōkōseijo Becky
Dungeons & Dragons Replay
Fake-Fake: Mozō Ohjo Sōdōki
Gekitō! Queen's Blade
Goddess!
Idolmaster Xenoglossia: Iori Sunshine!+
My-HiME Destiny
Neverland Chronicle
Nihon Jōkū Irassaimase
Yūgeshō

See also
HJ Bunko

References

External links
Charano!'s official website 

2006 establishments in Japan
2013 establishments in Japan
Bi-monthly manga magazines published in Japan
Defunct magazines published in Japan
Light novel magazines
Magazines established in 2006
Magazines disestablished in 2013
Magazines published in Tokyo
Monthly manga magazines published in Japan